Stuart Felix Reed (January 8, 1866 – July 4, 1935) was an American lawyer and Republican politician who became the Secretary of State of West Virginia (1909–1917) and represented West Virginia's 3rd congressional district in the United States House of Representatives (1917–1925).

Early and family life

Reed was born near Philippi, Barbour County, West Virginia to Margaret J. Reed and her farmer husband, Melton D. Reed. By 1880, the family also included a daughter Orea (age ) Reed attended the Barbour County public schools and taught in country schools. He graduated from the Fairmont State Normal School in 1885 and from the law department of West Virginia University at Morgantown in 1889.

He married Bonnie Belle Smith (1872-1954), daughter of James and Ellen Smith of Harrison County on June 16, 1898.

Career

He founded and edited the Athenaeum (college journal) in 1889 and was the editor of the Telegram in Clarksburg, West Virginia 1890–1898.
Reed was a member of the West Virginia Senate 1895–1899 and also the postmaster of Clarksburg 1897–1901. He served as the president of the board of trustees of Broaddus College 1901–1908. In addition, he was a member of the International Tax Conference at Louisville, Kentucky in 1909 and the Secretary of State of West Virginia 1909–1917. He also was the president of the Association of American Secretaries of State in 1915.

Voters from West Virginia's 3rd District as a Republican to the Sixty-fifth and to the three succeeding Congresses (March 4, 1917 – March 3, 1925). In Congress, he served as chairman, Committee on Expenditures in the Department of Justice (Sixty-seventh Congress) and the Committee on District of Columbia (Sixty-eighth Congress). In his final term, he defeated Democrat Eskridge Morton. Reed declined to be a candidate for renomination in 1924.

Death and legacy

After leaving Congress, Reed engaged in literary pursuits and changed his residence to Washington, D.C., He died there on July 4, 1935. His widow survived him by nearly two decades. He was buried in Elkview Masonic Cemetery, Clarksburg, West Virginia.

References

External links

 

1866 births
1935 deaths
Politicians from Clarksburg, West Virginia
Secretaries of State of West Virginia
Editors of West Virginia newspapers
People from Philippi, West Virginia
Fairmont State University alumni
West Virginia University College of Law alumni
Republican Party West Virginia state senators
Educators from West Virginia
Republican Party members of the United States House of Representatives from West Virginia